Eidolon was a Canadian power metal band formed in 1993 by brothers Shawn and Glen Drover (who both went on to become members of Megadeth). The band was signed to Metal Blade Records, and released four records on that Label. Eidolon signed soon after to Escapi Records. The band has released seven studio albums to date. In 2005, Eidolon announced the addition of new vocalist Nils K. Rue (Pagan's Mind).

In a 2010 interview, founder and drummer Shawn Drover said he had no plans to record another album with the band. "No. Why make another album that nobody buys? We did six records and that band got us [himself and brother Glen] into Megadeth, so I will always be thankful. I'll never say anything bad about it. Glen and I did that band, but doing six records that didn't sell and doing another one wouldn't make any sense...I'll do something with Glen, but it won't be that. It would be something totally different because I don't want to go backwards. I want to keep going forward."

The band reunited in 2015 and released a new single on November 9, 2015 titled "Leave This World Behind".

Members

Final members 
Nils K. Rue – vocals (2004-2007, 2015) 
Glen Drover – guitars (1993-2007, 2015)  
Adrian Robichaud – bass (2000-2007, 2015) 
Shawn Drover – drums (1993-2007, 2015)

Former members 
 John Tempest – bass (1994–1995) 
Slav Simanic – guitars (1996) 
Criss Bailey – bass (1996–1997) 
Brian Soulard – vocals (1996–2001) 
Pat Mulock – vocals (2001–2003)

Timeline

Discography

Studio albums
Zero Hour (1996)
Seven Spirits (1997)
Nightmare World (2000)
Hallowed Apparition (2001)
Coma Nation (2002)
Apostles of Defiance (2003)
The Parallel Otherworld (2006)

Demos
The Blue Tape (1994)
The Sacred Shrine (1995)

Single
Leave This World Behind (2015)

Compilation
Sacred Shrine (2003)

References

External links 
Official website (archived)

Canadian power metal musical groups
Canadian thrash metal musical groups
Musical groups from Toronto
Musical groups established in 1993
Musical groups disestablished in 2007
Musical quartets
1993 establishments in Ontario
2007 disestablishments in Ontario